Vartej is a census town in Bhavnagar district in the Indian state of Gujarat.

Geography

Vartej is a city in the State of Gujarat. The closest tourism destination to Vartej is Bhavnagar. Other close by tourism destinations include Palitana, Dahej and Ankleshwar. The nearest major railway station to Vartej is Bhavnagar Trmus (BVC) which is at a distance of 4.8 km. The nearest airport is at Bhavnagar which is at a distance of 12 km.

It has an average elevation of 29 metres (95 feet).
Vartej is one of the Village in Bhavnagar Taluk in Bhavnagar District in Gujarat State . Vartej is located 9.4 km distance from its Taluk Main Town Bhavnagar . Vartej is 6.9 km far from its District Main City Bhavnagar . It is 176 km far from its State Main City Gandhinagar .

Nearby villages are Fariyadka (2.7 km), Kardej (3.4 km), Sodvadra (3.8 km), Shedhavadar (4.3 km), Shampara (4.6 km). Nearest towns are Bhavnagar (9.4 km), Sihor (10.5 km), Ghogha (22 km), Vallabhipur (24.8 km).

Other villages in the Bhavnagar Taluk include Adhelai, Alapar, Bhadbhidiya, Bhadi, Bhandariya, and Bhojpara.

Other villages in Post Office (364060) are Kamlej, Sidsar, Vartej, Kardej, Fariyadka.

Tourism Destinations near Vartej
Bhavnagar 	City holidays		
Palitana	        Pilgrimage/Religious	Heritage/Culture	
Dahej	        River/Backwater		
Ankleshwar	Pilgrimage/Religious	

Schools in Vartej

1 . VARTEJ K.V. P. SCHOOL

2 . AMBAVADI P. SCHOOL

3 . INDIRA NAGAR P. SCHOOL

Colleges near by Vartej

1 . Shantilal Shah Engineering College, Bhavnagar 
Address : post. vartej; bhavnagar a-- 364060.

2 . Swami Vivekanand College of Computer Science 
Address : nr. sport cmplx; sidsar rd;bhavnagar a.

3 . Shri Shantilal Shah Engineering College 
Address : post.vartej; bhavnagar a--364060 Gujarat.

Demographics
 India census, Vartej had a population of 9703. Males constitute 52% of the population and females 48%. Vartej has an average literacy rate of 62%, higher than the national average of 59.5%: male literacy is 70%, and female literacy is 53%. In Vartej, 16% of the population is under 6 years of age.

Notable People
Chetan Sakariya, Indian Cricketer

Disha Vakani ,  Indian Actress

References

Cities and towns in Bhavnagar district